Wangcun is a town in Jingyan County in southern Sichuan province, China, located  east-southeast of downtown Leshan and  southwest of the county seat and served by China National Highway 213. , it has one residential community (社区) and 12 villages under its administration.

See also 
 List of township-level divisions of Sichuan

References 

Towns in Sichuan
Jingyan County